Ischyrus impressopunctatus is a species of beetle of the genus Ischyrus.

Description 
Its original description in Latin states that it is: 

"rufo-fulvus, oblongus, fortiter punctatus ; capita nigro, thorace fulvo, fortiter punctato, disco punctis 3 nigris in linea transversa, margine antico dentibus 2 approximatis, postico 2 separatis nigris; elytris rufo-fulvis, sutura nigra, fortius punctato-striatis, interstitis subtiliter punctatis, fascia basali valde dilacerata, maculis 2 fulvis includente, fascia subapicali depauperata, macula parva apicali libera ; corpore subtus rufo-piceo, prosterno rufo. L. 2 3/4 lin."

With an additional comment in English:

"Distinct by the coarse punctuation and the thorax with 3 black dots."

Range 
An individual matching the original description was identified in Araçariguama, in São Paulo, Brazil in 2022.

References 

Erotylidae